Here is the list of all the collaborations and remixes from Puerto Rican reggaeton duó Wisin & Yandel with other singers in other albums.

Year 
2000
"Todas Quieren Ser Las Mas Bellas" (Feat. Baby Rasta & Gringo)
"Voy Por Ti" (Feat. Tempo)
2001
"Sensual Te Ves" (Feat. Baby Ranks)
2002
"Salgo Filateauo" (Feat. Divino, Baby Ranks)
"Abusadora" (Feat. Fido)
"Piden Perreo" (Feat. Alexis & Fido)
"Sedúceme" (Feat. Alexis)
2003
"Por Qué No/Una Llamada" (Feat. Tisuby y Georgina)
2004
"Saoco" (Wisin Feat. Daddy Yankee)
"El Jinete" (Wisin Feat. Alexis & Fido)
"No Se" (Wisin Feat. Tony Dize)
"Estoy Preso" (Wisin Feat. Gallego)
"Siente El Calor" (Wisin Feat. Tony Dize)
"Mami, Yo Quisiera Quedarme" (Yandel Feat. Alexis & Fido)
"La Calle Me Lo Pidió" (Yandel Feat. Tego Calderón)
"En La Disco Me Conoció" (Yandel Feat. Fido)
"Listo Para El Cantazo" (Yandel Feat. Alexis)
"Royal Rumble (Se Van)" (Wisin Feat. Daddy Yankee, Wise, Don Omar, Héctor el Father, Yomo, Franco "El Gorila", Alexi, Zion, Arcángel)
2005
"Dale" (Feat. Mr. Phillips)
"Paleta" (Feat. Daddy Yankee)
"La Barria" (Feat. Héctor el Father)
"Sensación" (Feat. Tony Dize)
"Noche de Sexo" (Feat. Anthony "Romeo" Santos)
"La Compañía" (Feat. Franco "El Gorila", Gadiel)
"Toma" (Wisin Feat. Franco "El Gorila")
"La Quebranta Hueso" (Feat. El Tío)
"No Me Dejes Solo" (Feat. Daddy Yankee)
"Mayor Que Yo" (Feat. Luny Tunes, Daddy Yankee, Héctor el Father, Baby Ranks)
2006
"Burn It Up" (Feat. R. Kelly)
"Take the Lead (Wanna Ride)" (Feat. Bone Thugs-n-Harmony, Fatman Scoop, Melissa Jimenez)
"Sacala" (Feat. Héctor el Father, Don Omar)
"Cuando Baila Reggaeton (Yandel Feat. Tego Calderón)
"Eléctrica" (Feat. Gadiel)
"Nadie Como Tu" (Feat. Don Omar)
"Soy De La Calle" (Feat. Franco "El Gorila", Gallego)
"Quiero Hacerte El Amor" (Feat.  El Tío, Franco "El Gorila")
"Yo Te Quiero (Remix)" (Feat. Luis Fonsi)
"Hacerte El Amor" (Wisin Feat. Yandel, Nicky Jam)
2007
"La Pared" (Feat. Don Omar, Gadiel)
"Un Viaje (Remix)" (Feat. Gadiel)
"Pegao (Remix)" (Feat. Elephant Man)
"Atrévete" (Feat. Franco "El Gorila")
"Perdido" (Yandel Feat. Jayko "El Prototipo")
"Torre de Babel (Reggaeton Mix)" (Feat. David Bisbal)
"El Teléfono" (Feat. Héctor el Father)
"Stars Are Blind (Luny Tunes Remix)" (Feat. Paris Hilton)
"Noche de Entierro (Nuestro Amor)" (Feat. Daddy Yankee, Héctor el Father, Tony Tun Tun)
"Lento (Remix)" (Feat. RBD)
"Lo Nuestro Se Fue (Noche de Entierro Remix)" (Feat. Luny Tunes, Alex Rivera, Ivy Queen, Daddy Yankee)
"No Llores (Remix)" (Feat. Gloria Estefan)
"Control" (Feat. Eve)
"Las Cosas Cambiaron" (Feat. Don Omar)
"Imaginate" (Feat. Tony Dize)
"Como Tú No Hay Nadie" (Feat. Jayko "El Prototipo")
"Oye, ¿Dónde Está El Amor?" (Feat. Franco De Vita)
"Jangueo" (Feat. Erick Right, Fat Joe)
"Tu Cuerpo Me Llama" (Feat. Gadiel)
"Tu Mirada" (Feat. Franco "El Franco")
2008
"Siguelo (Remix)" (Feat. Jayko "El Prototipo")
"Animo" (Feat. Tego Calderón)
"Sexy Movimiento (Remix)" (Feat. Nelly Furtado)
"Descontrol" (Feat. Tony Dize)
"Permítame" (Yandel Feat. Tony Dize)
"Pa' Darle" (Wisin Feat. Tony Dize)
"Perdido (Bachata Remix)" (Feat. Marcy Place)
"Lloro Por Ti (Remix)" (Feat. Enrique Iglesias)
"Asi Soy" (Yandel Feat. Franco "El Gorila")
"Vamonos A Hacerlo" (Yandel Feat. Franco "El Gorila")
2009
"Descara (Remix)" (Feat. Yomo)
"Me Estás Tentando (Remix)" (Feat. Franco "El Gorila", Jayko "El Prototipo")
"Mujeres In The Club" (Feat. 50 Cent)
"Me Estoy Muriendo" (Wisin Feat. Franco "El Gorila")
"Sexo Seguro" (Yandel Feat. Franco "El Gorila")
"Pa' Lo Oscuro" (Feat. Franco "El Gorila", Yaviah)
"All Up 2 You" (Feat. Aventura, Akon)
"All Up 2 You (Remix)" (Feat. Aventura, Akon, Adrian Banton)
"Perfecto" (Feat. Ivy Queen, Yaviah)
"¿Cómo Quieres Que Te Olvide?" (Feat. Ednita Nazario)
"Gracias A Ti (Remix)" (Feat. Enrique Iglesias)
"Sandugeo" (Feat. Yomo, Franco "El Gorila", Gadiel)
"Imaginate" (Feat. T-Pain)
"Desaparecio" (Feat. Gadiel, Tico El Imigrante)
"Ella Me Llama (Remix)" (Feat. Akon)
"Suave y Lento" (Wisin Feat. Jowell & Randy, Franco "El Gorila", Tico "El Inmigrante")
"Amanacer" (Yandel Feat. Jowell & Randy, Gadiel)
"Prrrum (Remix)" (Feat. Cosculluela)
"Acercate" (Feat. Ivy Queen)
"Ella Me Llama Tarde" (Wisin Feat. Tony Dize)
2010
"Te Siento (Remix)" (Feat. Franco "El Gorila")
"Te Siento (Remix)" (Feat. Jowell & Randy)
"Loco (Remix)" (Feat. Jowell & Randy)
"No Me Digas Que No" (Feat. Enrique Iglesias)
"Reverse Cowgirl (Remix)" (Feat. T-Pain)
"Tu Me Peleas" (Yandel Feat. De La Ghetto, Franco "El Gorila")
"La Reunion De Los Vaqueros" (Feat. Franco "El Gorila", De La Ghetto, Tego Calderón, Cosculluela)
"Tumbao" (Yandel Feat. De La Ghetto)
"De Noche Y De Dia" (Yandel Feat. Cosculluela)
"No Dejes Que Se Apague" (Feat. 50 Cent, T-Pain)
2011
"Estoy Enamorado (Remix)" (Feat. Larry Hernandez)
"Zun Zun Rompiendo Caderas (Remix)" (Feat. Pitbull, Tego Calderón)
"Reggaeton Pesao" (Yandel Feat. Gadiel, Franco "El Gorila")
"Frío" (Feat. Ricky Martin)
"Se Acabo" (Feat. Tito "El Bambino")
"Sigan Bailando" (Feat. Tego Calderón, Franco "El Gorila")
"Fever" (Feat. Sean Kingston)
"Perreame" (Feat. Jowell y Randy)
"Tomando El Control" (Feat. Jayko "El Prototipo", Gadiel)
"Suavecito y Despacio" (Feat. Alexis & Fido)
"Uy, Uy, Uy" (Wisin Feat. Franco "El Gorila", O'Neill)
"Se Viste" (Wisin Feat. Gadiel)
"Vengo Acabando" (Feat. Alberto Stylee, Franco "El Gorila")
"Musica Buena" (Yandel Feat. Franco "El Gorila")
"Duelo" (Wisin Feat. Franco "El Gorila", O'Neill)
"Energia (Remix)" (Feat. Alexis & Fido)
"Soñando Despierto" (Feat. Cosculluela)
"5 O'Clock (Remix)" (Feat. T-Pain)
"5 O'Clock (Remix)" (Feat. T-Pain, Lily Allen)
"Vete" (Feat. Aventura)
2012
"Pass at Me (Remix)" (Feat. Timbaland)
"Pass at Me (Remix)" (Feat. Timbaland, Pitbull)
"Follow the Leader" (Featuring Jennifer Lopez)
"Sexo Y Pasión" (Gadiel feat. Yandel)
"Si Te Digo La Verdad (Remix)" (Gocho Feat. Wisin)
"Prende (feat. Franco "El Gorila & O'Neil)
"Something About You" (feat. Chris Brown & T-Pain)
"Amor Real" (Gocho feat. Yandel & Wayne Wonder)
"Me Gustas" (Tito El Bambino feat. Yandel)
"Hipnotízame (Remix) (feat. Daddy Yankee)
2013
"Limbo" (Daddy Yankee feat. Wisin & Yandel)
"Tu Olor (Remix)" (Tito El Bambino feat. Wisin)
"Yo Soy De Aquí" (Don Omar feat. Yandel, Arcángel & Daddy Yankee)
 "Hable de Ti" (Yandel)
"Sistema" (Wisin feat. Jory)
"Zumba (Remix) (Don Omar feat. Yandel & Daddy Yankee)
"Solo Verte (Remix)" (Cosculluela feat. Wisin & Divino)
"Tu Carcel" (Marco Antonio Solís feat. Wisin & Yandel, David Bisbal & Alejandra Guzmán) (for La Voz... México)
"Sistema (Remix)" (Wisin feat. Jory, Tito El Bambino, Cosculluela & Eddie Avila)
"In Your Eyes" (Inna feat. Yandel)
"Calenton" (Daddy Yankee feat. Yandel)
"Moviendo Caderas" (Yandel feat. Daddy Yankee)
"Enamorado de Ti (Yandel feat. Don Omar)
"Para Irnos (A Fuego)" [Yandel feat. J Álvarez & Gadiel]
"Plakito" (Yandel feat. Gadiel)
"Desde el Primer Beso" (Gocho feat. Wisin)
"Que no muera la esperanza" (Franco De Vita feat. Wisin)
"Sexo" (Wisin feat. Zion)
Baby danger" (Wisin feat. Sean Paul)
"Que viva la vida (Remix)" (Wisin feat. Michel Teló)
"La copa de todos" (David Correy feat. Wisin & Paty Cantú)
2014
"Furia" Oneill Ft Wisin & Ñengo Flow
"Ricos y Famosos" Tito El Bambino Ft Ñengo Flow & Wisin
"Muevelo" Sofia Reyes ft Wisin
"Creo en mi" Natalia Jimenez Ft Wisin
"La calle lo pidio" Tito el Bambino Ft Cosculluela, Nicky Jam, Wisin, J Alvarez & Zion
"Desde el primer beso" Gocho ft Wisin & Tito el Bambino
"Tu cuerpo pide sexo" Wisin Ft Zion
"El sobreviviente" Wisin Ft 50 Cent
"Presion" Wisin Ft Cosculluela
"Si te vas" Wisin Ft Gocho
"Heavy Heavy" Wisin Ft. Tempo
"Passion Whine" Farruko Ft. Sean Paul Y Wisin 
"Claro" (Wisin feat. Jory)
"Mi Peor Error (Remix)" (Alejandra Guzmán feat. Yandel)
"Prometo Olvidarte (Remix)" (Tony Dize feat. Yandel)
"Adrenalina" (Wisin feat. Jennifer Lopez & Ricky Martin)
"Fiesta en San Juan" (Assia Ahhatt feat. Wisin)
"Humanos a Marte" (Chayanne feat. Yandel)
"Duro Hasta Abajo" (Yandel feat. Gadiel)
"Plakito (Remix)" (Yandel feat. Gadiel & Farruko)
"A Que No Te Atreves (Remix)" (Tito El Bambino feat. Yandel, Chencho & Daddy Yankee)
"La Calle Me Llama" (Farruko feat. Yandel, Ñengo Flow & D.OZI)
"Nena Mala" (Wisin feat. Tito El Bambino)
"La Temperatura" (J Álvarez feat. Wisin)
"Besar Tu Piel" (Gocho feat. Wisin & O'Neill)
"Poder" (Wisin feat. Farruko)
"Control" (Wisin Feat. Chris Brown, Pitbull)
"Te Extraño" (Wisin Feat. Franco De Vita)
2015
"Me Marcharé" (Los Cadillacs feat. Wisin)
"Dale Frontu" (Eloy feat. Wisin)
"Lejos de Aquí (Remix)" (Farruko feat. Yandel)
"Nota de Amor" (Wisin feat. Carlos Vives & Daddy Yankee)
"Yo Quiero Contigo (Remix)" (Wisin feat. Plan B)
"Pierdo la Cabeza (Remix)" (Zion & Lennox feat. Farruko & Yandel)
"Báilame" (Shaggy feat. Yandel)
"Al Bailar" (Yuri feat. Yandel)
"Como Yo Te Quiero" (El Potro Alvarez feat. Yandel)
"Quédate Conmigo" (Jory feat. Zion & Wisin)
"Diggy Down (Remix)" (Inna feat. Yandel & Marian Hill)
"Calentura (Remix)" (Yandel feat. Tempo)
"Jaque Mate (Remix)" (Yandel feat. Omega)
"Él Está Celoso (Remix)" (Tito El Bambino feat. Yandel)
"Baddest Girl In Town" (Pitbull feat. Mohombi & Wisin)
"A Ti Te Encanta (Remix)" (Alexis & Fido feat. Tony Dize, Don Miguelo & Wisin)
"En Lo Oscuro" (Don Omar feat. Wisin & Yandel)
"Dobla Rodilla (Don Omar feat. Wisin)
"Las Fresas (Remix Urbano)" (Banda el Recodo feat. Wisin)
"Rumba" (Anahí feat. Wisin)
"Baby Boo (Remix)" (Cosculluela feat. Arcángel, Daddy Yankee & Wisin)
"Piquete (Wisin feat. Plan B)
"Yo Soy de Barrio" (Tego Calderón feat. Yandel)
"Tú Me Enloquences (Baby Rasta & Gringo feat. Wisin)
"Fronteamos Porque Podemos" (De La Ghetto feat. Daddy Yankee, Ñengo Flow & Yandel)
"Dices (Remix)" (De La Ghetto feat. Arcángel & Wisin)
"No Sales de Mi Mente" (Yandel feat. Nicky Jam)
"Mayor Que Yo 3" (Luny Tunes feat. Don Omar, Daddy Yankee & Wisin & Yandel)
"Ginza (Remix)" (J Balvin feat. Yandel)
"Si Lo Hacemos Bien (Remix) (Wisin feat. J Álvarez & De La Ghetto)
"Desde el Día en que Te Fuiste" (ChocQuibTown feat. Wisin)
"Decídete" (Arcángel feat. Wisin)
"No Tengo Dinero" (Wisin Feat. Juan Gabriel)
"Corazon Acelerado (Remix)" (Wisin Feat. Pipe Bueno)
"Los Vaqueros" (Wisin Feat. Gavilan, Baby Rasta, Cosculluela, Franco "El Gorila", Ñengo Flow, J Alvarez. Farruko, Pusho, Tito "El Bambino". Arcángel, Jenay)
"Amor de Locos" (Wisin Feat. Jenay, Jory Boy)
"Que Se Sienta El Deseo" (Wisin Feat. Ricky Martin)
"Caramelo" (Wisin Feat. Cosculluela, Franco "El Gorila")
"Dime Que Sucedio" (Wisin Feat. Tony Dize)
"Ahi Es Que Es" (Wisin Feat. J Alvarez)
"Tu Libertad" (Wisin Feat. Prince Royce)
"Nos Queremos" (Wisin Feat. Divino)
"Yo Me Dejo" (Wisin Feat. Alexis)
"Ven Bailame" (Wisin Feat. Gocho)
"Pegate Pa Que Veas" (Wisin Feat. Eloy, Franco "El Gorila")
"Prisionero" (Wisin Feat. Pedro Capo, Axel)
"Adicto a Tus Besos" (Wisin Feat. Los Cadillacs)
2016
"Sola (Remix)" (Wisin Feat. Anuel AA, Farruko, Daddy Yankee, Zion & Lennox)
"Tan Facil (Urban Remix)" (Wisin Feat. CNCO)
"Duele El Corazon" (Wisin Feat. Enrique Iglesias)
2017
"Hacerte El Amor" (Wisin Feat. Yandel, Nicky Jam)
"Move Your Body" (Wisin Feat. Timbaland, Bad Bunny)
"Todo Comienza En La Disco" (Wisin Feat. Daddy Yankee, Yandel)
"Esta Vez" (Wisin Feat. Don Omar)
"Quisiera Alejarme" (Wisin Feat. Ozuna)
"Prohibida" (Wisin Feat. Zion & Lennox)
"Amor Radioactivo" (Wisin Feat. Mario Domm)
"Dulce" (Wisin Feat. Leslie Grace)
"Quedate Conmigo (Version Dance)" (Wisin Feat. Chyno Miranda, Gente de Zona, Mauro Menendez)
"Si Tu La Ves" (Wisin Feat. Nicky Jam)
"Como Antes" (Yandel Feat. Wisin)
"Bonita (Remix)" (Wisin Feat. Yandel, Nicky Jam, Jowell & Randy, J Balvin, Ozuna)
2018
"Callao" (Feat. Ozuna)
"Aullando" (Feat. Anthony "Romeo" Santos)
"Dame Algo" (Feat. Bad Bunny)
"La Luz" (Feat. Maluma)
"Mi Intencion" (Feat. Miky Woodz)
"Deseo" (Feat. Zion & Lennox)
"Ojala" (Feat. Farruko)
"Quisiera Alejarme (Remix)" (Wisin Feat. Ozuna, CNCO)
"Todo El Amor" (Wisin Feat. De La Ghetto, Maluma)
"No Te Vas (Remix)" (Wisin Feat. Nacho, Noriel)
"Alguien Robo" (Wisin Feat. Sebastian Yatra, Nacho)
"Quiero Mas" (Wisin Feat. Ozuna, Yandel)
"Unica (Remix)" (Wisin Feat. Ozuna, Yandel, Anuel AA)
"Pensando en Ti" (Wisin Feat. Anuel AA)
"Me Niego" (Wisin Feat. Ozuna, Reik)
"Solita" (Wisin Feat. Bad Bunny, Ozuna, Almighty)
2019
"Duele" (Feat. Reik)
"Si Supieras" (Feat. Daddy Yankee)
"Imaginaste (Remix)" (Feat. Jhay Cortez)
"Mi Error (Remix)" (Feat. Eladio Carrion, Zion & Lennox, Lunay)
"Por Contarle Los Secretos" (Wisin Feat. Jon Z, Chencho Corleone)
"Una Noche" (Wisin Feat. Rauw Alejandro)
"3G" (Wisin Feat. Jon Z, Don Chezina)
"Deseo" (Wisin Feat. Kevin Roldan)
"Si Me Das Tu Amor" (Wisin Feat. Carlos Vives)
"Quizas" (Wisin Feat. Sech(singer), Dalex, Justin Quiles, Feid, Lenny Tavarez, Zion)
"Comerte a Besos" (Wisin Feat. Justin Quiles, Nicky Jam)
2020
"Ganas de Ti" (Feat. Sech (singer))
"Moviendolo (Remix)" (Feat. Pitbull, El Alfa)
"Mi Niña" (Wisin Feat. Myke Towers)
"Enemigos Ocultos" (Wisin Feat. Ozuna, Myke Towers, Arcángel, Cosculluela, Juanka)
"Provocame (Remix)" (Wisin Feat. Miky Woodz, Manuel Turizo, Justin Quiles, Lenny Tavarez)
"Sexy Sensual" (Wisin Feat. Tito "El Bambino", Zion & Lennox, Cosculluela)
"Gistro Amarillo" (Wisin Feat. Ozuna)
"Mas de Ti" (Wisin Feat. Gotay "El Autentico", Ozuna)
"Por Contarle Los Secretos (Reggaeton Remix)" (Wisin Feat. Jon Z, Chencho Corleone)
"Borracho" (Wisin Feat. Brytiago)
"Watablamblam" (Wisin Feat. Jumbo, Farruko)
"Boogaloo Supreme" (Wisin Feat. Victor Manuelle)
"Una Noche (Unplugged)" (Wisin Feat. Rauw Alejandro)
"3G (Remix)" (Wisin Feat. Jon Z, Yandel, Farruko, Don Chezina, Chencho Corleone, Myke Towers)
2021
"Mala Costumbre" (Feat. Manuel Turizo)
"LEYENDAS" (Feat. Karol G, Nicky Jam, Ivy Queen, Zion, Alberto Stylee)
"No Te Veo (Remix)" (Feat. Pacho El Antifeka, Jhay Wheeler)
"Ya Paso" (Feat. Zion, Cosculluela, Revol)
"Fiel" (Wisin Feat. Jhay Cortez)
"Emojis de Corazones" (Wisin Feat. Ozuna, Jhay Cortez)
"Ame" (Wisin Feat. Jumbo, Lyanno, Zion)
"Fiel (Remix)" (Wisin Feat. Jhay Cortez, Anuel AA, Myke Towers)
"Mi Niña (Remix)" (Wisin Feat. Myke Towers, Maluma, Anitta (singer))
"Loco" (Wisin Feat. Nicky Jam, Sech)
"Amanecer Contigo" (Wisin Feat. Abdiel, Zion)
"Prendelo" (Wisin Feat. Brray, Jon Z)
"Prendelo" (Wisin Feat. Jhay Cortez)
"Baila Conmigo" (Wisin Feat. Linarez, KEVVO, Franco "El Gorila")
"Mari Mari" (Wisin Feat. Chencho Corleone)
"En Mi Habitacion" (Wisin Feat. Lunay, Rauw Alejandro)
"Me Dañas La Mente" (Wisin Feat. Dalex)
"Mami" (Wisin Feat. Zion)
"No Me Acostumbro" (Wisin Feat. Reik, Ozuna, Miky Woodz)
"Pata Abajo" (Wisin Feat. Sech (singer), Yandel)
2022
"Te Veo Bailar" (Feat. Baby Rasta & Gringo, Brray, Alejandro Armes, DJ Nelson)
"Sentido" (Feat. Alex Rose)
"Llueve" (Feat. Sech (singer), Jhay Cortez)
"Mayor Que Usted" (Feat. Natti Natasha, Daddy Yankee)
"Cerramos los Ojos" (Wisin Feat. Gotay "El Autentico", Chris Andrew)
"Me Siento Bien" (Wisin Feat. Chimbala)
"Por Si Vuelves" (Wisin Feat. Luis Fonsi)
"Adicta" (Wisin Feat. Lyanno)
"Extraño" (Wisin Feat. Yandel)
"Volar" (Wisin Feat. Alejo, Chris Andrew)
"Buenos Dias" (Wisin Feat. Camilo)
"Como Tu Lo Haces" (Wisin Feat. Linares)
"Labios Prohibidos" (Wisin Feat. Abdiel)
"Por Ley" (Wisin Feat. Linares)
"Crazy" (Wisin Feat. Ozuna, Arcángel, Lenny Tavarez, Jhay Wheeler)
"Mato a Cupido (Remix)" (Wisin Feat. Dreah, Chris Andrew)
"Soy Yo" (Wisin Feat. Don Omar, Gente de Zona)
"SMP (Sol, Mar y Playa)" (Wisin Feat. Farruko, KEVVO)

References

Wisin and Yandel
Wisin and Yandel